Carl Fredrik Walter Ola Ohlsson (born 12 June 1931) is a Swedish actor. In 1956 he won a scholarship to Royal Academy of Dramatic Art, where he made his stage debut as Tesman with Siân Phillips as Hedda Gabler 1957. Opening at The Duke of York's Theatre in London 3 December 1957. Later at Det Nye Teatret in Oslo and at The Vanbrugh, RADA. He has a long career in Swedish Television, Film and Theatre. For several years he was a member or of the ensemble at The Royal Dramatic Theatre in Stockholm Sweden.

References

External links

Swedish male television actors
Living people
1931 births
Alumni of RADA
People from Ulricehamn Municipality